Ferjani Bel Haj Ammar (5 January 1916 – 2000) was a Tunisian trade unionist and politician. He was the Minister of the Economy before becoming President of the Tunisian Confederation of Industry, Trade and Handicrafts for 28 years between 1960 and 1988. He died in 2000, aged 83 or 84.

Elections
Ferjani Bel Haj Ammar was elected to the Chamber of Deputies five times in total:
1959 Tunisian general election
1964 Tunisian general election1969 Tunisian general election1974 Tunisian general election1979 Tunisian parliamentary election

References

External link

1916 births
2000 deaths
Tunisian politicians